Yuxarı Nemətabad (also, Yuxarı Ne’mətabad, Yukhary Neymetabad, and Yukhary-Neymatabad) is a village and municipality in the Agdash Rayon of Azerbaijan. It has a population of 795. The municipality consists of the villages of Yuxarı Nemətabad and Hacılar.

References

External Links 

Populated places in Agdash District